The 1986 International Rules Series was the second series between Australian rules footballers from Australia and Gaelic footballers from Ireland. The series took place in Australia and consisted of three test matches between the Australian and Irish international rules football teams. Ireland won the series 2–1 and by 32 points over the three test matches.

Summary

First Test
Venue: WACA Ground, Perth

Date: 11 October 1986

Crowd: 25,000

Second Test
Venue: VFL Park, Melbourne

Date: 19 October 1986

Crowd: 10,883

Third Test
Venue: Football Park, Adelaide

Date: 24 October 1986

Crowd: 10,000 approx

 Beitzel Medal (Best player for the series) — Robert Dipierdomenico (Australia)

References

External links
 Australia v. Ireland since 1967
 Aussie Rules International: The Second Series – 1986
 International Rules – Series 2 – 1986 – Australia

International Rules Series
International Rules Series
International Rules series
International sports competitions hosted by Australia